Selim Kalaycı (born 12 February 2000) is a Turkish male volleyball player. He is part of the Turkey men's national volleyball team. On club level he plays for Galatasaray.

External links
Player profile at Galatasaray.org
Player profile at Volleybox.net

2000 births
Living people
Turkish men's volleyball players
Galatasaray S.K. (men's volleyball) players